Mohale Dam is a  concrete faced rock-fill dam in Lesotho. It is the second dam, under Phase 1B of the series of dams of the proposed Lesotho Highlands Water Project (LHWP), which will eventually include five large dams in remote rural areas of Lesotho and South Africa. The project has been built at a cost of US$1.5 billion.

The Mohale Dam was awarded the 2005 Fulton Awards by the Concrete Society of South Africa as having the "Best Construction Engineering Project and Best Construction Technique."

Geography
The dam is built across the Senqunyane River below its confluence with the western tributary, the Likalaneng River. Investigation of the dam site in the "Highlands of Lesotho" has revealed "rounded, steep sided valleys" where the soil cover is thin and basaltic lava is the dominant formation. The dam site has been identified with two geological features of faults which needed treatment measures.

Background
The importance of the large water resources potential of the country, one of the various natural resources of the land-locked country. Subsequently, Director of Public Works, requested an engineer to  examine the potential of the project as a possible means to supplement the water supply needs in South African gold mines.

In 1983, the World Bank began implementing the project. Phase I covered some of the key strategic components of the project, while Phase IB's financing covered not only engineering design and supervision of the main works but an institutionalized framework with a panel of experts in the field of engineering and the environmental and social aspects of the project. The Development Bank of Southern Africa (DBSA), the European Investment Bank (IIB), and  Export Credit agencies were also approached to finance the project.

The Lesotho Highlands Water Project (LHWP) was established, with the objective of supplying water to the Gauteng region of South Africa and for hydroelectric power to meet the needs of Lesotho. A treaty signed between the government of Lesotho and South Africa gave the green light for the project, and the team was set up to implement the project. The treaty is limited to Phases IA and IB only. The Trans-Caledon Tunnel Authority (TCTA), vested with the operation and maintenance aspects of the project is guided by the larger establishment of the Lesotho Highlands Development Authority (LHDA).
The project envisages diverting water in the highlands of the country through three dams; two under Phase I (PhaseI A -Katse Dam and Phase II - Mohale Dam) and the Polihali Dam under Phase II. Construction of the Phase I dams were completed in 2003 and formally commissioned in 2004.

Features

The water supply meets the needs of the Gauteng region which encompasses the mining and industrial cities of Johannesburg and Pretoria.

It is built as an embankment dam with a rock-fill concrete-face on the upstream side. The volumetric content of the dam structure is 7.5 million m³. The spillway, located on the left bank of the dam, is not gated and flood is routed over the crest of the ogee shaped spillway through a concrete lined chute with a flip bucket and a stilling basin at its terminus.

Safety measures
The geological features at the dam site were evaluated for possibilities of displacement. The treatment measures implemented to address this condition involved excavation of a trench of  width and  depth below the toe slab which is meant to function as a concrete "socle". A grout curtain was also created through the "lineament" (fault line) and a grouting gallery was provided for the purpose that covered the downstream part of the embankment up to the toe-slab area near the lineament. Both the "socle" and the toe-slab incorporate movement joints consisting of  compressible materials and a PVC water stop.

Temporary cofferdams and river diversions
A temporary 300 000m3 cofferdam, with a pre-cofferdam, were built in mid-1999.

River diversion was effected through two concrete lined diversion tunnels constructed on the left bank.

Aggregate
Approximately 13 000m3 of rock was placed every day. Two quarries were used; one to supply the bulk of the rock for the rock-fill and the other for the higher quality doleritic basalt used in the concrete aggregate and filter layers in the dam.

Concrete
The concrete facing on the upstream face of the dam was constructed concurrently at two levels. The lower part of the concrete slab was laid up to two thirds height of the dam from the bottom while the top one third face was also concurrently laid. This special construction method facilitated early completion of the dam. The dam is said to be one of the top ten concrete faced embankment dams in the world.

Submergence
The project's reservoir submergence involved some of the most fertile agricultural land in the area. The project affected  390 households and some 1700 people.

References

Bibliography

Dams completed in 2002
Dams in Lesotho
2002 establishments in Lesotho
Concrete-face rock-fill dams